is a 1982 Japanese drama film directed by Eiichi Kudo. It was entered into the 33rd Berlin International Film Festival.

Cast
 Ken Ogata as Seiji Ōtaki
 Ayumi Ishida as Keiko Yamane
 Shigeru Izumiya as Toshiaki Sakagami
 Gannosuke Ashiya as Seiji Shimamura
 Kai Atō as Kita
 Tatsuo Endō as Kitou
 Moeko Ezawa as Noriko's mother
 Makoto Fujita as Kawabata
 Masataka Iwao as Shoji
 Keizō Kanie as Yakuza
 Kaoru Kobayashi as Miura
 Akaji Maro as Painter
 Tōru Masuoka as Teruichi Tanaka
 Mikio Narita as Kuroki
 Tadashi Naruse as Sunakawa

References

External links

1982 films
1980s Japanese-language films
1982 drama films
Films directed by Eiichi Kudo
Japanese drama films
1980s Japanese films